The Rand Grand Prix was a motor race held at various circuits in South Africa. The first event took place in 1937 but it was not held regularly until the 1960s, when it was run to Formula One rules and formed part of the non-Championship calendar. At that time it represented an annual warm-up race before the South African Grand Prix.

Results 
 Races shown with a pink background indicate non-Formula One races.

 
Formula One non-championship races